Abortion in Egypt is prohibited by Articles 260–264 of the Penal Code of 1937. However, under Article 61 of the Penal Code, exceptions may be granted in cases of necessity, which has typically been interpreted to permit an abortion necessary to save the life of the pregnant woman. In some cases, this exception has been extended to cases where the pregnancy poses dangers to the pregnant woman's health, and to cases of foetal impairment. A physician can only perform an abortion in such cases when two specialists approve, unless the woman's life is in imminent danger.

Any person who induces an abortion may be imprisoned, and physicians who do so may be sentenced to prison. Convictions are uncommon, because the prosecution must prove that the woman was pregnant and the means by which the pregnancy was interrupted.

In 1998, Muhammad Sayyid Tantawy, the Grand Imam of al-Azhar, issued a fatwa calling for access to abortion for unmarried women who had been raped. In 2004, he approved a draft bill that would permit abortion in the case of rape; the bill was unsuccessful.

Despite legal restrictions, abortions are common. In a 2000 study of 1,025 women from six villages in Upper Egypt, 416 were found to have had at least one abortion; among this group, there were 265 abortions per 1000 live births. Abortions are carried out by indigenous methods, at clandestine clinics, or at great expense by private gynecologists.

In addition, unsafe abortions are common: a 1998 study found that about 20% of obstetric hospital admissions were for post-abortion treatment. One study estimated that between 1995 and 2000, there were 2,079,216 abortions, and 2,542 maternal deaths due to unsafe abortions.

References

Egypt
Egypt
Healthcare in Egypt
Egypt